The Governor of Sool is the chief executive of the Sool, leading the region's executive branch.

Overview
Sool is claimed by both Somaliland and Puntland, with each government appointing a Governor of Sool. As of 2022, most of Sool is effectively controlled by Somaliland. Therefore, the authority of the Governor of Sool in Somaliland and the Governor of Sool in Puntland are quite different.

Somaliland, which declared its independence in 1991, claimed the entire area of former British Somaliland, including Sool.  In 1998, Puntland declared itself a founding state and declared the inhabited area of Darod in northeastern Somalia as its territory, including Sool. Since then, the ownership of Sool has been ambiguous, but with Puntland's occupation of Sool's capital Las Anod in 2002, much of the area became under Puntland's effective control. However, the position was reversed when Somaliland occupied Las Anod in 2007. After losing Las Anod, Puntland was based in Tukaraq to its east. Then the Dhulbahante clan in Sool created the SSC in 2009 and the Khatumo State in 2012, declaring that it belongs neither to Somaliland nor Puntland. However, both were defeated in battles with Somaliland forces and agreed to merge with Somaliland in 2012 and in 2017. In 2018, Tukaraq and in 2022, Bo'ame were occupied by Somaliland forces from Puntland, most of Sool are effectively controlled by Somaliland.  On August 4, 2022, A delegation led by the Governor of Sool Region of Somaliland, Abdikarin Aden Haji Diriye, who was escorted by a large number of military vehicles, reached Bo'ame town. However, Boame is not completely controlled by Somaliland, but Puntland troops are stationed on the outskirts.

Somaliland

Governors of the regions is appointed to the office by the Somaliland president. The current governor of Sool is Abdikarim Adan Haji Diriye.

Puntland

See also

Sool
Politics of Somaliland

References

External links

Sool
Governors of Somaliland
Governors of Sool